Yolandi Du Toit (born 3 June 1985) is a South African mountain biking and road cyclist, who represented her nation at the 2006, 2007 and 2008 UCI Road World Championships.

Major results

2006
 African Road Championships
1st  Road race
5th Time trial
2007
 1st  Road race, All-Africa Games
 African Road Championships
2nd  Time trial
3rd  Road race

References

External links
 

1985 births
South African female cyclists
Living people
Place of birth missing (living people)
Competitors at the 2007 All-Africa Games
African Games gold medalists for South Africa
African Games medalists in cycling
21st-century South African women